The 1949 BAA draft was the third annual draft of the Basketball Association of America (BAA), which later became the National Basketball Association (NBA). The draft was held on March 21, 1949, before the 1949–50 season. In this draft, eleven remaining BAA teams along with the Indianapolis Olympians who joined the BAA, took turns selecting amateur U.S. college basketball players. The draft consisted of 8 rounds and a regional selection period, with 75 players selected. This was the final BAA Draft before the league was renamed the NBA in August 1949. The 75 players selected matched the same number of players selected in the 1989 draft; both drafts have the fewest picks selected prior to 1989 (when the NBA draft was reduced to two rounds ever since).

Draft selections and draftee career notes
Howie Shannon from Kansas State University was selected first overall by the Providence Steamrollers. However, Ed Macauley and Vern Mikkelsen were selected before the draft as St. Louis Bombers' and Minneapolis Lakers' territorial picks respectively. Four players from this draft, Vern Mikkelsen, Ed Macauley, Dick McGuire and Slater Martin have been inducted into the Basketball Hall of Fame.

Key

Draft

Other picks
The following list includes other draft picks who have appeared in at least one BAA/NBA game.

Undrafted players
These players were not selected in the 1949 draft but played at least one game in the NBA.

See also
 List of first overall NBA draft picks

Notes

References
General

Specific

External links
NBA.com
NBA.com: NBA Draft History

Draft
Basketball Association of America draft
BAA draft
BAA draft
BAA draft
Basketball in New York City
Sporting events in New York City